Advibhavi may refer to:

Advibhavi (Gangawati), a village in Karnataka, India
Advibhavi (Kushtagi), a village in Karnataka, India
Advibhavi (Maski), a village in Karnataka, India
Advibhavi (Mudgal), a village in Karnataka, India